Paw Paw High School is a public secondary school in Antwerp Township, Michigan, United States. It serves grades 9-12 for Paw Paw Public Schools.

Academics
Paw Paw ranked 133rd in Michigan and 3,781st nationally in the 2020 U.S. News & World Report annual survey of public high schools. Vocational education classes are available through the Van Buren Technology Center. Students can pursue dual enrollment at either Western Michigan University or Kalamazoo Valley Community College.

Demographics
The demographic breakdown of the  860 students enrolled for the 2022-23 school year was: 
Male - 50.0%
Female - 50.0%
Asian - 1.0%
Black - 1.0%
Hispanic - 7.0%
Native Hawaiian/Pacific islanders - N/A
White - 88.0%
Multiracial - 3.0%
31.0% of the students were eligible for free and 3.0% were eligible reduced-cost lunch.

Mascot controversy

The mascot used to be the Redskins. The mascot brought much controversy and was heavily criticized by many outside the community. Having voted to retain the mascot in 2017, the school board decided to end the continuing controversy in March 2020 and retire the name at the end of the school year. On July 13, 2020, the school changed its mascot to the "Red Wolves".

Athletics
The Paw Paw Red Wolves compete in the Wolverine Conference. School colors are red and white. The following Michigan High School Athletic Association (MHSAA) sanctioned sports are offered:

Baseball (boys) 
Basketball (girls and boys) 
Bowling (girls and boys) 
Competitive cheerleading (girls) 
Cross country (girls and boys) 
Football (boys) 
Golf (girls and boys) 
Ice hockey (boys) 
Soccer (girls and boys) 
Boys state champion - 1998
Softball (girls) 
Tennis (girls and boys) 
Track and field (girls and boys) 
Boys state champion - 1934, 1935, 1936, 1947
Volleyball (girls) 
Wrestling (boys)

References

External links

Public high schools in Michigan
Schools in Van Buren County, Michigan
School buildings completed in 1998
1998 establishments in Michigan